Trombone Trouble is a Walt Disney cartoon that was released on February 18, 1944. It is the only Donald Duck cartoon where Roman/Greek gods play a role.

Plot
Pete is cacophonically playing his trombone through the night. The gods Jupiter and Vulcan (who look like ducks similar to Donald) are woken by Pete's noise and decide to think of some way to stop this. Donald has a similar issue. He can't sleep with Pete's noise. He goes to Pete's house, and Pete responds by blowing through the trombone as hard as he can right in Donald's face, sending Donald back into his house into a wall. Jupiter and Vulcan notice Donald wanting to stop the noise, so Jupiter decides to give him some of his power so he can get rid of Pete. Donald fires lightning bolts from his hands, makes his hands electric, and develops godlike strength and succeeds in getting rid of Pete. Jupiter and Vulcan think that their troubles are now over, and go back to sleep on their cloud. Donald notices Pete's trombone and has the desire to play it. Jupiter and Vulcan awake to see that the one whom they helped get rid of Pete is now playing the trombone himself and they collapse from the cloud with exasperation.

Voice cast
 Donald: Clarence Nash
 Pete: Billy Bletcher
 Jupiter and Vulcan: John McLeish

Home media
The short was released on December 6, 2005, on Walt Disney Treasures: The Chronological Donald, Volume Two: 1942-1946.

References

External links

1944 films
1940s Disney animated short films
Donald Duck short films
1944 animated films
1944 short films
Animated films based on classical mythology
Films scored by Oliver Wallace
Films produced by Walt Disney
Films with screenplays by Carl Barks